Samsung Galaxy A3 (2017) (or Samsung Galaxy A3 2017 Edition) is an Android smartphone produced by Samsung Electronics. It was announced on January 2, 2017, along with Samsung Galaxy A5 (2017) and Samsung Galaxy A7 (2017). This move marks Samsung's first product launch since the discontinuation of the Galaxy Note 7 back in October 2016.

Samsung Galaxy A3 (2017) runs Android 6.0.1 Marshmallow with TouchWiz user interface right out-of-the-box. The smartphone features an Exynos 7870 SoC consisting an octa-core ARM Cortex-A53 CPU and Mali-T830 GPU and backed by 2 GB RAM and 16 GB internal storage expandable to 256 GB via the MicroSD slot which can also be used for a second Nano-SIM. The device retains a non-removable battery like its predecessor and its battery is rated at 2350mAh. Its extra features similar to the features found in Samsung's 2016 flagships include IP68 water resistance, Always On Display, and 3D glass backing with Gorilla Glass 4. A new "Always On Display" functionality displays a clock, calendar, and notifications on-screen when the device is in standby. It also features an FM radio.

This handset is currently the last in the A3 series, and also the last Samsung handset to feature a screen smaller than 5".

Availability
Following the unveiling, Samsung announced that they would sell up to 20 million smartphones, targeting Western and Eastern Europe, Africa, Asia, and Latin America. Just like its predecessors, the Galaxy A3 (2017) was not made available in the United States, China, Malaysia and India.

Variants

References

Android (operating system) devices
Samsung Galaxy
Samsung smartphones
Mobile phones introduced in 2017
Discontinued smartphones